Lucky Carson is a 1921 American silent drama film directed by Wilfrid North. It features Earle Williams, Earl Schenck, Betty Ross Clarke, Gertrude Astor, Collette Forbes, James Butler, and Loyal Underwood in the lead roles.

Plot
As described in a film magazine, down and out John Peters (Williams) is about to jump into the Thames River, having lost a fortune he made at the race track. He changes his mind, however, and in an altercation with Rudolph Kluck (Schenck) strikes that gentleman down, loads him into a passing cab, and changes clothes with him. With the money he found on Kluck, he goes to the United States, taking on the name David Carson, and while passing through Madison Square accosts an out of work jockey sitting on a bench. The latter gives him a tip on the races and they become fast friends. Carson also plunges into Wall Street and corners the market in cotton. He saves Doris Bancroft (Clarke) from drowning and falls in love with her. Kluck again crosses his path and Carson gives him some tips on the stock market to atone for robbing him in London. Kluck has an affair with Russian writer Madame Marinoff (Astor) and asks Carson to shield him and secure a packet of letters that the Russian holds. Doris misinterprets Carson's interest in the Russian, but there is a happy ending when she learns the truth.

Cast
Earle Williams as John Peters / David 'Lucky' Carson
Earl Schenck as Rudolph Kluck
Betty Ross Clarke as Doris Bancroft
Gertrude Astor as Madame Marinoff
Collette Forbes as Edith Bancroft
James Butler as Tommy Delmaer
Loyal Underwood as "Runt" Sloan

Preservation status
Lucky Carson is considered to be a lost film.

References

External links

American silent feature films
Vitagraph Studios films
1921 drama films
1921 films
Silent American drama films
American black-and-white films
Lost American films
1921 lost films
Lost drama films
Films directed by Wilfrid North
1920s American films
1920s English-language films